Julien Malzieu (born 4 May 1983 in Le Puy-en-Velay, Auvergne) is a French rugby union and sevens player for  in the Top 14 competition.

Career
A tall and rangy wing, Malzieu burst onto the international scene in the 2008 Six Nations Championship, scoring a try on his debut for France against Scotland.

However, despite his promising start he did not gain a regular spot in the side with coach Marc Lievremont giving many other players a chance. The next time he scored was during the 34–10 loss to England in the 2009 Six Nations Championship. He scored another try the next week against Italy, but missed the 2009 Autumn internationals.

He was recalled for the 2010 Six Nations Championship after injuries to Aurélien Rougerie and Benjamin Fall but just played a bit part role coming off the bench a few times.

There is much competition in his position for France which has limited his time on the pitch so far.

At club level he has played an integral role in the rise Clermont Auvergne to the forefront of European rugby. He is seen as a reliable points source for them as his prolific try scoring record shows.

His brother, Jérémy Malzieu was in the Clermont Auvergne squad, but now plays for Saint-Etienne in the Pro D2.

His other successes include being played as a starter in most of the recent 2012 Six Nations Championship games in which he scored a try in the first game against Italy.

References

External links
RBS 6 Nations profile
official site (French)
statistics on itsrugby.co.uk

1983 births
Living people
ASM Clermont Auvergne players
France international rugby union players
French rugby union players
Male rugby sevens players
People from Le Puy-en-Velay
Sportspeople from Haute-Loire